Harvard ROTC was one of the first Reserve Officers' Training Corps (ROTC) units in the country, founded in 1916.  The original program was led by Captain Constant Cordier. By the fall of 1952 forty percent of the incoming freshmen class at Harvard University enrolled in programs that led to a ROTC commission.  

Harvard has the third most graduates who have received the Medal of Honor.  With eighteen recipients, only West Point and the US Naval Academy have more.  

In 1969, in the middle of sometimes violent protests over the Vietnam War, Harvard downgraded the status of ROTC to an extracurricular activity.  The cited reason was over academic standards on coursework.  The military’s official departure from Harvard began in the years that followed.    For the next several decades Harvard’s connection to ROTC was by allowing their students to take ROTC courses at Massachusetts Institute of Technology.  

By 1994, in the midst of the controversy over the Don’t Ask Don’t Tell (DADT) law on homosexuality, Harvard committed to upholding ROTC ties, but only through indirect alumni contributions.  This compromise prevented all ties from being severed as was recommended in the 1992 faculty committee report.   

Harvard University President Drew Faust promised a return of ROTC to campus, once DADT was repealed, in a speech with Chairman of the Joint Chiefs Admiral Mike Mullen at the Kennedy School of Government on 17 November 2010. In December 2010 Congress passed a bill to repeal President Bill Clinton’s 1993 DADT Policy.  

On March 4, 2011, Harvard University President Drew Faust signed an agreement with Navy Secretary Ray Mabus formally recognizing the return of Naval ROTC to Harvard’s campus. According to the agreement's terms, a Director of Naval ROTC would be appointed, and Harvard would provide funding for the program. The Navy agreement was structured to go into effect when the repeal of DADT was implemented, and was followed by a similar agreement with the Army.   President Barack Obama, who in his 2011 State of the Union address called on all universities to open their doors to ROTC, responded through his spokesman by saying:

Harvard Medal of Honor recipients

Notable alumni
 Anthony Brown, Harvard College (1984) and Harvard Law School (1992), U.S. Representative (MD-4) and Colonel in the U.S. Army Reserve.
 Eliot A. Cohen, Harvard College (1977) and Harvard University (Ph.D. 1982), Counselor in the U.S. Department of State (2007–2009), Director of the Strategic Studies Program at the Paul H. Nitze School of Advanced International Studies of the Johns Hopkins University.
 Paul G. Kirk, Harvard College (1960) and Harvard Law School (1964), Chairman of the Democratic National Committee (1985–1989), U.S. Senator from Massachusetts (2009–2010).

References

External links 
 Harvard
 Advocates for Harvard ROTC
 Air Force ROTC
 Army ROTC
 Navy ROTC
 US Army
 US Navy
 US Air Force
 US Marine Corps

ROTC programs in the United States
Harvard University